Cananéia is the southernmost city in the state of São Paulo, Brazil, near to where the Tordesilhas Line passed. The population in 2020 was 12,541 and the area is 1,242.010 km². The elevation is 8 m. 
The city of Cananéia is host to the Dr. João de Paiva Carvalho research base belonging to the Oceanographic Institute of the University of São Paulo.

History
Founded in 1531, Cananéia is considered by some to be the oldest city in Brazil (5 months before the foundation of São Vicente ) but due to the lack of official documentation proving this fact, São Vicente is officially the oldest city in Brazil. The historic center of Cananéia still preserves the architectural styles adopted by the first houses from the colonial period to the end of the 19th century.

Conservation

The municipality contains the  Ilha do Cardoso State Park, created in 1962.
It contains part of the Tupiniquins Ecological Station.
It contains the  Mandira Extractive Reserve, established in 2002.
The municipality contains the  Taquari Extractive Reserve, created in 2008.
It contains the  Ilha do Tumba Extractive Reserve, also created in 2008.
It contains the  Itapanhapima Sustainable Development Reserve, created at the same time.

References 

Municipalities in São Paulo (state)
Populated coastal places in São Paulo (state)
Populated places established in 1531
1890s establishments in Brazil
1892 establishments in South America